Smolyan is a town and ski resort in the south of Bulgaria near the border with Greece. It is the administrative and industrial centre of the Smolyan Province. The town is built along the narrow valley of the Cherna ('black') and the Byala ('white') river in the central Rhodope Mountains, making it the longest city in Bulgaria. It is located at the foot of the mountain's highest peak Golyam Perelik (2191 m).Popular ski resorts of Pamporovo and Chepelare lie in the vicinity. As of June 2022 the town has a population of 30 689 inhabitants.

Name
The name of the town comes from the local Slavic tribe of the Smolyani, the name of whom is probably cognate to the Slavic word smola ("resin").

History

According to archaeological evidence, the area around Smolyan was first settled in the 2nd-1st millennium BC. In the Middle Ages it acquired its name from the Slavic tribe, the Smolyani, who settled in the region in the 7th century. During the Middle Ages, it was ruled by the Part of the Byzantine and Bulgarian Empires. For a while during the 14th century it came under the control of the Bulgarian feudal lord Momchil, alongside the whole Rhodope mountains, before eventually being subjugated by the Ottoman Empire. Smolyan remained under Ottoman rule for five centuries, a township of the Ottoman Sanjak of Gümülcine in the Adrianople Vilayet between 1867 and 1912. 

The area was liberated by the 21st Sredna Gora Regiment led by Vladimir Serafimov in 1912, during the First Balkan War. The modern town of Smolyan was formed by the merger of three existing villages — Ustovo, Raykovo and Ezerovo — in 1960.

Population 
The population of Smolyan just after World War II was about 5,000. Since then, it started growing decade by decade, mostly because of the migrants from the rural areas and the surrounding  smaller towns, reaching its peak in the beginning of the 1990s, exceeding 34,000.

Ethnic linguistic and religious composition
According to the latest 2011 census data, the individuals declared their ethnic identity were distributed as follows:
Bulgarians: 25,045 (97.0%)
Roma: 258 (1.0%)
Turks: 153 (0.6%)
Others: 120 (0.5%)
Indefinable: 248 (1.0%)
Undeclared: 4,818 (15.7%)
Total: 30,642

In Smolyan Municipality 32708 declared as Bulgarians, 301 as Roma and 170 as Turks and 9,000 did not declare their ethnic group.

Religion
In 1912, Aha Celebi said that 8,252 families already live, including 2,815 of Bulgarians Exarchists, 140 of Bulgarians Patriarchists and 5,297 of Bulgarian Muslims or Pomaks. (Lyubomir Miletich, "The Destruction of Thracian Bulgarians in 1913") In 1912, in the town live 320 families of Bulgarians Muslims, 80 of Bulgarians Exarchists and 40 Patriarchists. In Ustuvo live 420 families Bulgarians Exarchists, in Raykovo - a total of 700 families of Bulgarians Exarchists, 100 of Bulgarians Patriarchists and 70 of Bulgarian Muslims. Currently, the religion of the majority in the city is christian orthodox.

Culture and sports 
Due to its suitable location on top of Mount Rozhen, the Bulgarian National Astronomical Observatory is located nearby, with a planetarium in operation in the town. There is one theatre, the Rhodope Drama Theatre, and a gathering of theatre practitioners and scholars known as The Rhodopi International Theatre Laboratory is held every summer. There is also a regional historical museum founded in 1935.

Smolyan has an elite division football team, PFC Rodopa Smolyan, that had been playing in the A Professional Football Group between 2003-2007.

The largest church in southern Bulgaria, the Cathedral of Saint Vissarion of Smolyan, was inaugurated in the city in July 2006.

Municipality
Smolyan is also the seat of Smolyan municipality (part of Smolyan Province), which includes the following 79 villages:

 Aligovska
 Arda
 Belev dol
 Bilyanska
 Borikovo
 Bostina
 Bukata
 Bukatsite
 Chamla
 Chepleten
 Chereshkite
 Chereshovo
 Chereshovska Reka
 Chokmanovo
 Chuchur
 Dimovo
 Dunevo
 Elenska
 Elyovo
 Fatovo
 Gabritsa
 Gela
 Gozdevitsa
 Gorna Arda
 Gorovo
 Gradat
 Gudevitsa
 Hasovitsa
 Isyovtsi
 Katranitsa
 Kiselichevo
 Kokorkovo
 Koshnitsa
 Kremene
 Kukuvitsa
 Kutela
 Laka
 Levochevo
 Lipets
 Lyulka
 Milkovo
 Mogilitsa
 Momchilovtsi
 Mugla
 Nadartsi
 Oreshitsa
 Ostri Pazlak
 Petkovo
 Peshtera
 Pisanitsa
 Podvis
 Polkovnik Serafimovo
 Poprelka
 Potoka
 Rechani
 Reka
 Rovina
 Selishte
 Shiroka Laka
 Sivino
 Slaveyno
 Smilyan
 Sokolovtsi
 Solishta
 Sredok
 Stikal
 Stoykite
 Sarnino
 Strazha
 Taran
 Tikale
 Trebishte
 Turyan
 Uhlovitsa
 
 Varbovo
 Vievo
 Vlahovo
 Zaevite
 Zmievo

Geography

Climate
Smolyan has either a warm-summer mediterranean climate (Köppen climate classification: Csb) or a dry-summer warm-summer humid continental climate (Köppen climate classification: Dsb), depending on if the 0 degrees celsius or -3 degrees celsius isotherm is used.

Honour
Smolyan Point on Livingston Island in the South Shetland Islands, Antarctica is named after Smolyan.

Notable people
 Valya Balkanska
 Victor Houteff, founder of the Davidian branch, an offshoot of the Seventh-day Adventist Church.
Velichko Cholakov

Gallery

References

External links

 Smolyan municipality website
 Smolyan municipality at Domino.bg
 Planetarium Smolyan
 National Astronomical Observatory "Rozhen"
 Official website of village of "Kutela"

 
Cities and towns in the Rhodopes
Populated places in Smolyan Province